= 2005 World Championships in Athletics qualification standards =

Qualifying standards for the 2005 World Championships in Athletics can be found here -
